The Real Is Back is the tenth mixtape by American rapper Jeezy, It was released on May 28, 2011. The Mixtape features guest appearances from 211, Slick Pulla, Scrilla, Fabolous, Yo Gotti, Lil Wayne, 2 Chainz, Boo, Freddie Gibbs, and Alley Boy. "Ballin'" featuring Lil Wayne debuted and peaked at #57 on the Billboard Hot 100 and would eventually be included as a track on the deluxe edition of Jeezy's fourth studio album Thug Motivation 103: Hustlerz Ambition. Since the mixtape's release, it has been downloaded over 100k times on DatPiff, certifying the mixtape gold.

Reception 

Ralph Bristout of XXL reviewed the mixtape positively, praising the rapping, duo chemistry, and production of the record. Bristout criticized some of the production as occasionally repetitive, with the bass and drum lines sounding similar between some tracks.

Track listing

References

2011 mixtape albums
Jeezy albums
Albums produced by Shawty Redd
Albums produced by Lex Luger
Albums produced by Drumma Boy
Albums produced by Metro Boomin